Aleric Lanty Abeygunawardena (1905-1998) was a Sri Lankan Inspector General Police (IGP) (1967–1970). 

Abeygunawardena was educated at S. Thomas' College, Mount Lavinia and joined the Ceylon Police Force on 28 September 1931 as a Sub-Inspector of Police. In May 1950 he was promoted to Assistant Superintendent of Police (ASP) and served as ASP Galle and ASP Kalutara. 

On 8 July 1967 he was appointed as the Inspector General Police, succeeding John Attygalle following his retirement, and served in that position until 13 September 1970.

Abeygunawardena then served as an Additional Secretary of the Ministry of External Affairs and Defence during the 1971 JVP Insurrection, leading the investigation into the insurrection.

He married Kate de Fonseka and they had four daughters.

References

Sri Lankan Inspectors General of Police
Alumni of the University of Ceylon
Alumni of S. Thomas' College, Mount Lavinia
1905 births
1998 deaths